Atractus occipitoalbus, the gray ground snake, is a species of snake in the family Colubridae. The species can be found in Ecuador, Bolivia, Peru, and Colombia.

References 

Atractus
Reptiles of Ecuador
Reptiles of Bolivia]
Reptiles of Peru
Reptiles of Colombia
Reptiles described in 1862
Taxa named by Giorgio Jan